Assin Central Municipal District (a.k.a. Assin Fosu Municipal District) is one of the twenty-two districts in Central Region, Ghana. Originally it was formerly part of the then-larger Assin District in 1988, until the southern part of the district was split off to create Assin South District on 18 February 2004; thus the remaining part has been renamed as the first Assin North District, which it was later elevated to municipal district assembly status on 29 February 2008 to become Assin North Municipal District. However on 15 March 2018, the southern part of the district was split off to create the present Assin North District; thus the remaining part has been renamed as Assin Central Municipal District. The municipality is located in the northwest part of Central Region and has Assin Fosu as its capital town.

List of settlements

Sources
 
 District: Assin Central Municipal District

References

Central Region (Ghana)

Districts of the Central Region (Ghana)